This is a List of Old Boys of St Joseph's College, Hunters Hill, they being notable former students - known as "Old Boys" of the Roman Catholic Church school, St Joseph's College in Hunters Hill, New South Wales, Australia.

[Year 1969] is the last year of school attendance. (Years in parentheses) are years lived or the year of notable achievement.

Clergy 
 Matthew Joseph Brodie (1864–1943), second Bishop of Christchurch, New Zealand (1915–1943), first New Zealand born Catholic bishop.
 Most Rev Geoffrey James Robinson (1937–2020), Auxiliary Bishop of Sydney 1984–2004, Titular Bishop of Rusuca.
 John Steven Satterthwaite (1928–2016), Bishop of Lismore 1971–2001.
 Most Rev Philip Edward Wilson (1950-2021), D.D. J.C.L., Archbishop of Adelaide.

Media, entertainment and the arts

 Frank Marien (1890–1936), Editor-in-chief of Smith's Weekly.
 Jimmy Sharman jnr (1912–2006), boxing promoter.
 John Olsen, AO, OBE [1943], (born 1928) artist.
 Denis Kevans (1939–2005), left-wing poet, songwriter and folk singer. 
 Brian Castro (born 1950), award-winning novelist & essayist.
 Jack Waterford (born 1952), former editor-in-chief of the Canberra Times'.
Peter Thompson (born 1952), ABC broadcaster & Adjunct Professor, Macquarie Uni, Dept of International Communication.
 Paul Field [1978], (born 1961), singer The Cockroaches and manager The Wiggles.
 John Field [1979], (born 1962), guitarist The Cockroaches and songwriter.
 Anthony Field [1980], (born 1963), guitarist and singer The Cockroaches and The Wiggles.
 Tony Henry [1980], (born 1963), drummer of the '80s pop band The Cockroaches.
 Tom Gleeson [1991], (born 1974), comedian, actor and radio personality.
 Jackson Mullane, (born 1987), Australian Gladiator character "Outlaw" and State representative rugby winger.

Military

Brigadier Sir Eugene Gorman (1891–1973), KBE, MC, QC military officer and barrister.
 Air Marshal, Sir John McCauley (1899–1989Kn), KBE, CB, RAAF commander.

Law

 Sir William Prentice MBE (1917-2004),  Justice Supreme Court of Papua New Guinea 1969-79; Chief Justice of PNG 1978-79.
 Hon. Justice Peter McInerney [1945], (1927–2014), New South Wales Supreme Court judge.
 Sir William Deane AC KBE [1947] (born 1931), former Governor-General and former Justice of the High Court of Australia.
 Hon. Chief Justice Murray Gleeson AC [1955], (born 1938), former Chief Justice Australia - High Court of Australia; former Chief Justice NSW - Supreme Court of New South Wales; former President - NSW Bar Asscn.
 John Marsden (1942–2006), President of the Law Society of NSW.
 Hon. Michael Grant (born 1963), Chief Justice of the Northern Territory

Politics

 Frank Downing (1907–1978), ALP MLA for Ryde, 1953–1968.
 Norm Ryan (1912–1997), ALP MLA for Marrickville, 1953–73.
 Harry Jensen (1913–1998), Lord Mayor of Sydney 1956-65, ALP MLA  for Wyong & Munmorah, 1965-1981 and NSW Cabinet Minister 1976-81.
 Jack Doohan OBE (1920–2007), National Party member of the New South Wales Legislative Council 1978–91.
 Laurie McGinty MBE (1921–1991), Mayor of Willoughby 1960-67, Lib MLA for Willoughby 1968–1978 and NSW Cabinet Minister 1973–76.
 Hon Kevin Cairns [1945] (1929–1984), Lib, MHR seat of Lilley in Queensland 1963-80; Federal Cabinet Minister 1971–72.
Alan Woods  (1930–1990), Secretary of the Department of Defence 1986–88
 Ernie Page  [1952], (1935–2018), Mayor of Waverley (Alderman 1962-1987), ALP MLA for Waverley (1981-1991) & Coogee (1991–2003) Minister for Local Government (1995–1999).
 Bill Heffernan (born 1943), Lib Senator for New South Wales since 1996.
 Craig Laundy [1988], Liberal MHR seat of Reid since 2013 and former Minister for Small and Family Business, the Workplace and Deregulation 2017–18.
 Roy Butler (Australian politician) [1994], (born 1977) Member of NSW Legislative Assembly for the seat of Barwon since March 2019.
 Tim Quilty  (Victorian politician) [1991], (born 1973) Member of the Victorian Legislative Council since November 2018 for the Liberal Democrats party.

Science, medicine and academia
Victor Warren Fazio(1940–2015) Pioneering colorectal surgeon
James Franklin [1970] (born 1953) Philosopher and historian
Robert Henry Frater, AO (Born 1937) Eminent Australian scientist
Ted O'Loughlin [1969] Head of Gastroenterology, Westmead Children's Hospital
John Lee (political scientist) [1991] (Born 1973) Australian academic and policy expert

 Business 
 Shane Moran [1979] (born 1961), aged-care entrepreneur and protector of Sydney's historic properties Swifts and Darling House.

Sport

Administration

 John O'Neill, former CEO of Australian Rugby Union and Football Federation Australia, chairman of Star Entertainment Group
Matt Carroll, former CEO of Yachting Australia and in 2017 appointed CEO of the Australian Olympic Committee.

Athletics
 Richard Honner, 400yd and long jump at the 1924 Paris Olympics.
 Jimmy Carlton, 100 and 200yd sprinter at the 1928 Amsterdam Olympics.
 Patrick Dwyer, silver medalist 4 × 400 m Relay Athens 2004, competitor Sydney 2000 & 1998 Commonwealth Games.

Cricket
 Stan McCabe, Australian Test Cricketer 39 Tests (1930–38).

Paralympics
 Evan O'Hanlon [2006], (born 1988) OAM, 5 x time gold-medal winning paralympic sprinter.

Rowing

 William Dixon [1928], 1936 Berlin Olympics (M2x).
 Clyde Elias [1929], 1936 Berlin Olympics (M8+).
 Phil Cayzer gold medalist Auckland 1950 (M8+) & bronze medalist at Helsinki 1952 (M8+).
 Bob Tinning gold medalist at Auckland 1950 (M8+) & bronze medalist at Helsinki 1952 (M8+).
 Alf Duval, silver medalist 1968 Mexico Olympics, (M8+).
 Joe Fazio [1960], (1942–2011) silver medalist 1968 Mexico Olympics, (M8+).
 Paul Rowe [1964], (1949-2015) finalist 1975 World C'ships (LM1X) & eight-time Australian champion.
Ted O'Loughlin [1969] 1974 World C'ships (M8+).
 Terry O'Hanlon [1972], coxswain 1975  & 77 World C'ships (M2+) & (M8+).
 Daniel Burke [1992], silver medalist Sydney 2000, M8.
 Francis Hegerty [2000], silver medalist Beijing 2008, M4-.
 Spencer Turrin, [2009], 2017 and 2018 World Champion (M4-); Rio 2016 Olympian M2-. Gold Medal 2021 Tokyo Olympics Men's coxless four (M4-)
 Tom Birtwhistle [2010], Paralympian at   Tokyo 2020 and  finalist 2022 World Championships (PR1 M1X).
 Jack Hargreaves [2011], 2017 and 2018 World Champion (M4-). Gold Medal 2021 Tokyo Olympics Men's coxless four (M4-)
 Campbell Watts [2013], silver medallist 2018 World Championships (M4X).
 Jack O'Brien [2016], Olympian & silver medallist 2022 World Championships (M4-).
 William O'Shannessy [2017], bronze medallist 2022 World Championships (M8+).

Rugby league

National representatives

 Harry Caples, Kangaroo five-eighth, (1921–1922).
 Arch Crippin, [1935] Kangaroo winger, (1936).
 Jack Beaton, Kangaroo versatile back, (1936–1938).
 Paul Chue, [1963] inaugural Kumuls captain, (1975).
 Ben Kennedy, [1992] Kangaroo lock-forward, (2000–2006).

First grade
 Morrie Murphy, Canterbury-Bankstown Bulldogs Winger (1947)
 Steve Broughton, [1974] Wests Magpies (1982–1984) & Parramatta (1985) winger.
 Mick Aldous, [1978] Canberra Raiders  centre (1984–85) and French Rugby League national coach.
 Matthew Wurth, [1978] North Sydney forward (1983–85).
 Justin Dooley, Wests Magpies & Sydney City Roosters (1990–2001).
 Darren Junee, Sydney City Roosters (1995–1998).
 Peter Jorgensen, [1990] Sydney City Roosters (1995–1996). Penrith Panthers (1997–2001).
 Jarrod Saffy, St George Dragons & Wests Magpies forward (2006–10) and Melbourne Rebels RU lock (2011–2013).
 Darcy Lussick [2006], Parramatta Eels & Manly-Warringah Sea Eagles forward (2012–18).
 Nathan Ross [2006], Newcastle Knights winger (2015–present).

Rugby union

Wallabies

 Dr Herbert Moran, Wallaby 1 Test (1908–09) and captain in 16 matches
 Ted Fahey, Wallaby 4 Tests (1912–14) and captain in 7 matches
 Steve Williams, Wallaby 28 Tests (1980–1985) and captain in 7 matches;
 Edward Larkin [1896], Wallaby hooker, 1 Test (1903), MLA and soldier;
 Bill Cody, Wallaby flanker, 3 Tests (1913);
 Ernie Reid, Wallaby centre, 3 Tests (1925);
 Harry Woods, Wallaby prop, 8 Tests (1925–1928);
 Eric Ford, (1904–86) Wallaby winger, 7 Tests (1927–29);
 Jack Ford [1924], (1906–85) [1924] Wallaby #8, 11 Tests (1925–30);
 Bill White, Wallaby winger, 3 Tests (1928–32);Bill White at ARU	
 John Malone, Wallaby prop-forward 4 Tests, (1936–37) ;Malone at ARU
 Bill Monti, Wallaby lock, 1 Test (1938) ;
 Paul Johnson, Wallaby centre, 2 Tests (1946);
 Des Bannon, Wallaby fly-half, 1 Test (1946);
 Brian Piper, Wallaby fullback, (1946–49);
 Arthur Tonkin, Wallaby winger, 6 Tests (1947–50);
 Jack Blomley, Wallaby centre, 7 Tests, (1949–50);
 Vince Heinrich, Wallaby flanker, 2 Tests (1954)
 Barry Roberts, Wallaby winger, 1 Test (1956);
 Terry Curley, [1955] Wallaby fullback, 9 Tests (1957–58)	
 John O'Gorman, Wallaby #8, 18 Tests (1961–67);	
 Ted Heinrich, Wallaby flanker, 10 Tests (1961–63);Heinrich at ARU
 Peter Ryan [1957], Wallaby fullback, 4 Tests (1963–66);
 Jake Howard, Wallaby prop-forward, 7 Tests (1970–73);
 Chris Carberry, Wallaby hooker, 13 Tests (1973–82);
 Declan Curran, Wallaby prop-forward 5 Tests (1980–83);
 Bruce Malouf, Wallaby hooker, 1 Test (1982);
 Tony Daly, Wallaby prop, 41 Tests (1989–95);
 Darren Junee, Wallaby fullback, 4 Tests (1989–94) and NSWRL player (Sydney Roosters);
 Tim Kelaher, Wallaby fullback, 3 Tests (1992–93);
 Peter Jorgensen, Wallaby winger, 2 tests (1992) 
 Matt Burke, [1990] Wallaby fullback, 81 Tests (1993–2004);
 Mark Bell, Wallaby hooker, 1 Test (1996);
 Bill Young, Wallaby prop, 46 Tests (2000–2005);
 Alister Campbell, Wallaby lock, 4 Tests (2005);
 Brett Sheehan, Wallaby scrum-half, 7 Tests (2006-2012) and NRL player (South Sydney)
 Luke Burgess, [2001] scrum-half 37 Tests, (2008–2011);
 Kurtley Beale, [2006] Centre, Fly Half, Fullback 96 tests (2009-2019)
 Paddy Ryan, prop 3 Tests (2012–2014)
 Peter Betham Wing, Centre 2 Tests (2013)
 Laurie Weeks Tighthead Prop, 2 tests (2013-2014)
 Tom Robertson [2012] prop 24 Tests (2016-)
 Ned Hanigan [2013] flanker 21 Tests (2017-)
 Tom Wright [2015], winger (2020-) and NRL Manly-Warringah Sea Eagles (2018).

Other nations' representatives
 Michael Lipman, 10 Test appearances for England (2004–2008).
 Steve Devine,[1994] 10 Test appearances New Zealand(2002–2003).
 Pat Duignan, 2 RWC appearances for Ireland (1998).

International rugby sevens
 Pat McCutcheon, Australian Rugby Sevens (2010-)

State/Provincial
 Peter Playford, NSW Waratahs and Australian Sevens three-quarter 2007–09.
 Afusipa Taumoepeau, Melbourne Rebels ACT Brumbies centre 2008–10.
 Jeremy Tilse, NSW Waratahs prop 2007–17
 Cameron Treloar, Queensland Reds lock 2006–07.
 Drew Hickey, NSW Waratahs flanker 2000–02.
 Matthew Carraro, NSW Waratahs centre/wing 2008–09. 2014–17
 Damien Fitzpatrick, NSW Waratahs hooker 2009–13, 2017-current.
 Alex Newsome, NSW Waratahs centre/wing 2018–current.
 Matthew Sandell, NSW Waratahs prop 2017–current.
 Andrew Deegan, Western Force fly half 2018–current.
 James Ramm, NSW Waratahs Wing 2020-current
 Michael Icely, Melbourne Rebels flanker 2021-current

Football
 Daniel Alessi, professional footballer for the Newcastle Jets.

Water Polo
 Sam McGregor, Olympian 2004, 2008 and 2012.

See also
List of non-government schools in New South Wales
List of boarding schools
Athletic Association of the Great Public Schools of New South Wales

References

Published sources
 Howell, Max (2006) Born to Lead - Wallaby Test Captains (2005) Celebrity Books, New Zealand
 Whiticker, Alan & Hudson, Glen (2006) The Encyclopedia of Rugby League Players, Gavin Allen Publishing, Sydney
 Oh brother! Medich family split: http://www.smh.com.au/national/oh-brother-medich-family-split-20090911-fkq3.html

Further reading
 Naughtin, M. 1981. A Century of Striving: St Joseph's College, Hunter's Hill, 1881-1981''. Macarthur Press, Sydney. .

External links
 St Joseph's College Website
St Joseph's College Old Boys Union

St Joseph
St Joseph's College